"Read My Lips" is a song written and performed by Scottish singer-songwriter Jimmy Somerville (formerly of the bands Bronski Beat and The Communards) from his 1989 début solo album Read My Lips. The song discusses the need for increased funding to fight HIV/AIDS.

Released in 1990 as Somerville's third solo single from the album Read My Lips, the song didn't chart as well as the previous single, "You Make Me Feel (Mighty Real)", a cover of the Sylvester original, which hit number 5 earlier the same year. However, it did chart inside the Top 40, peaking at number 26 on the UK Singles Chart, and was featured on Now That's What I Call Music! volume 17.

Track listing
12" Vinyl Single - London Recordings (UK Release)
"Read My Lips (Enough Is Enough)"
"Read My Lips (Enough Is Enough)"
"Strangers "

Chart performance

References

1989 songs
Jimmy Somerville songs
1990 singles
Songs written by Jimmy Somerville
Songs about HIV/AIDS
London Records singles
LGBT-related songs